Jack William Hendry (born 7 May 1995) is a Scottish professional footballer who plays as a centre-back for Belgian First Division A side Club Brugge, and the Scotland national team. He has previously played for Partick Thistle, Wigan Athletic, Dundee, Celtic and KV Oostende. He has also had loan spells at Shrewsbury Town, Milton Keynes Dons, A-League club Melbourne City and Serie A club Cremonese.

Early life
Hendry was born in Glasgow. He had spells as a youth player with Celtic and Peterborough United. He joined Dundee United on trial in 2013 and subsequently signed a contract with them, but his time there was severely disrupted by a bout of glandular fever.

Club career

Partick Thistle
Hendry joined Partick Thistle in August 2014. He featured in Thistle's development squad frequently, before making his first-team debut for the side on the final day of the 2014–15 season in a goalless draw against Motherwell at Fir Park on 23 May 2015.

On 2 June 2015, Hendry signed a new one-year contract with the Jags, alongside David Wilson and goalkeepers Paul Gallacher and Tomáš Černý. After an outstanding pre season, Hendry came on as a substitute in the opening game of the season away to Hamilton after only 29 minutes following an earlier red card for Frédéric Frans, he went on to help keep a clean sheet alongside Liam Lindsay in defence as the match finished 0–0. Following the match it was reported that English Premier League club Everton had been watching Hendry.

Wigan Athletic
On 1 September 2015, Hendry signed for Wigan Athletic. He joined fellow League One side Shrewsbury Town on loan until the end of the season in March 2016.

On 31 August 2016, Hendry joined League One side Milton Keynes Dons on loan until January 2017. On 4 October 2016, Hendry made his debut for Milton Keynes Dons, featuring in a 0–1 away EFL Trophy group stage win over Peterborough United.

Dundee
Hendry signed a two-year contract with Dundee in July 2017. He played regularly and became a key player for Dundee in the first part of the 2017–18 season. Dundee rejected offers from Celtic for Hendry during January 2018, before agreeing a club-record fee on 31 January.

Celtic
Celtic signed Hendry to a four-and-a-half-year contract on 31 January 2018. He made his debut for the club in a 1–0 defeat away to Kilmarnock on 3 February.

Melbourne City
On 22 January 2020, Hendry joined A-League club Melbourne City on loan for the rest of the season. During his second appearance for Melbourne, Hendry suffered a knee ligament injury that required surgery.

Oostende
Hendry was loaned to Belgian club KV Oostende in July 2020, and Celtic gave the Belgian club first option to buy him. In his Jupiler Pro League debut in September 2020 he scored a last-minute winner against KV Mechelen to clinch a 1–0 victory for his new club. Hendry would win the Jupiler Pro League Player of the Season at the end of the campaign. Hendry moved to Oostende on a permanent basis in June 2021.

Club Brugge
On 31 August 2021, just two-months after signing permanently for KV Oostende, Hendry joined Club Brugge on a four-year contract. He featured in Brugge's famous 1–1 Champions League draw against a star-studded PSG side (featuring Messi, Mbappé and Neymar playing together for the first time), and was named as Player of the Match by the BBC. Hendry would score his first goal for the side in a win over Royal Antwerp in a game which clinched Club Brugge the Jupiler Pro League title.

Loan to Cremonese
On 1 September 2022, Hendry joined Cremonese in Italy on loan, with an option to buy. Hendry made his debut for Cremonese in a Serie A game against Atalanta. On 26 January 2023, Hendry would return to his parent club.

International career
In March 2018, Hendry received his first call-up to the senior Scotland squad for the friendlies with Costa Rica and Hungary. He made his Scotland debut on 27 March, playing in a 1–0 win against Hungary. Hendry was recalled to the squad in March 2021, after performing well in the Belgian league for KV Oostende. He was then selected in the Scotland squad for the delayed UEFA Euro 2020 finals, and scored his first international goal in a pre-tournament friendly against the Netherlands.

Hendry scored a crucial equaliser against the Republic of Ireland in the UEFA Nations League on 23 September 2022. Scotland went on to win the game 2-1.

Career statistics

Club

International

Scores and results list Scotland's goal tally first, score column indicates score after each Hendry goal.

Honours
Celtic
Scottish Premiership: 2017–18, 2018–19
Scottish Cup: 2017–18, 2018–19
Scottish League Cup: 2018–19

Club Brugge
Belgian First Division A: 2021–22
Belgian Super Cup: 2022

Individual
Sport Voetbal Belgian Pro League Player of the Season: 2020–21

References

External links
 
 

1995 births
Living people
Footballers from Glasgow
Scottish footballers
Scotland international footballers
Association football defenders
Partick Thistle F.C. players
Wigan Athletic F.C. players
Shrewsbury Town F.C. players
Milton Keynes Dons F.C. players
Dundee F.C. players
Celtic F.C. players
Melbourne City FC players
K.V. Oostende players
Club Brugge KV players
U.S. Cremonese players
Scottish Professional Football League players
English Football League players
Belgian Pro League players
A-League Men players
UEFA Euro 2020 players
Scottish expatriate footballers
Expatriate soccer players in Australia
Scottish expatriate sportspeople in Australia
Expatriate footballers in Belgium
Scottish expatriate sportspeople in Belgium
Expatriate footballers in Italy
Scottish expatriate sportspeople in Italy
Dundee United F.C. players